The 11th AVN Awards ceremony, organized by Adult Video News (AVN), honored pornographic films released in 1993 and took place on January 8, 1994, at Bally's Hotel and Casino in Paradise, Nevada beginning at 7:45 p.m. PST / 10:45 p.m. EST. During the ceremony, AVN presented AVN Awards in 78 categories. The ceremony was produced by Gary Miller. Actor Randy West hosted the show for the third time; his co-hosts were actresses Summer Knight and Janine Lindemulder.

Justine: Nothing to Hide 2 won eight awards, including Best Film and Best Director for Paul Thomas. A comedy, Haunted Nights, took six awards, while Hidden Obsessions and a gay movie, Romeo & Julian, each won four.

Winners and nominees 

Justine: Nothing to Hide 2 led all nominees with thirteen nominations; Whispered Lies had twelve.

The winners were announced during the awards ceremony on January 8, 1994. Jonathan Morgan took home four statuettes, the best showing ever for a male performer. Mike Horner’s award for Best Actor—Film tied him with Eric Edwards as the only other three-time best actor winner.

Major awards 

Winners are listed first, highlighted in boldface, and indicated with a double dagger.

Additional award winners 
These awards were also announced at the awards show, in two winners-only segments read by Angela Summers and Summer Knight.

 Best All-Girl Video: (All The Girls Are) Buttslammers
 Best All-Girl Sex Scene, Film: Janine, Julia Ann; the ice dildo scene, Hidden Obsessions
 Best Alternative Feature Film: Beach Babes From Beyond
 Best Alternative Film Featurette or Specialty Tape: Satin and Lace 2
 Best Alternative Video: Sex on the Beach
 Best Amateur Tape: New Faces, Hot Bodies 6: The Exchange Student, Part One—Favors
 Best Amateur Series: Amorous Amateurs
 Best Anal Scene: Tiffany Mynx, Randy West, Kitty Yung; Sodo-Mania 5
 Best Anal-Themed Tape: Anal Siege
 Best Art Direction, Film (tie): Hidden Obsessions, Immortal Desire
 Best Art Direction, Video: Haunted Nights
 Best Boxcover Concept: Rocket Girls
 Best Cinematography: Andrew Blake, Hidden Obsessions
 Best Compilation Tape: Buttwoman's Favorite Endings
 Best Editing, Film: Philip Christian, Immortal Desire
 Best Editing, Video: Kunga Sludge, The Creasemaster's Wife
 Best Explicit Series: Kink-O-Rama
 Best Foreign Release: Private Video Magazine, Volume 1
 Best Gonzo Tape: Seymore Butts In Paradise
 Best Music: Let's Play Music, Les Femmes Erotique
 Best New Director, Film: Flavio Paris, Butt-O-Rama
 Best New Director, Video: Dale Lavi, Perpetual Tuesdays
 Best Non-Sex Performance, Film or Video: Jonathan Morgan, Haunted Nights
 Best Overall Marketing Campaign: American Garter, VCA Platinum
 Best Packaging, Film: Whispered Lies
 Best Packaging, Specialty: Dude Looks Like A Lady
 Best Packaging, Video (tie): Hungry, Part 1; Pussyman: The Search
 Best Pro-Am Tape: More Dirty Debutantes 22
 Best Pro-Am Series: More Dirty Debutantes

 Best Screenplay, Film: Raven Touchstone, Justine: Nothing to Hide 2
 Best Screenplay, Video: Jace Rocker, Jonathan Morgan; Haunted Nights
 Best Sex Scene, Film (Group): Rocco Siffredi, Tiffany Million, Jon Dough, Lacy Rose, Crystal Wilder, Francesca Lé; New Wave Hookers 3
 Best Specialty Tape, Big Bust: Boobarella
 Best Specialty Tape, Bondage: Kym Wilde's Ocean View
 Best Specialty Tape, Other Genre: A Scent Of Leather
 Best Specialty Tape, Spanking: Defiance: Spanking and Beyond
 Best Tease Performance: Tianna, Justine: Nothing To Hide 2
 Best Videography: Kathy Mack, Joe Rock, Frank Marino; Pussyman 2

GAY VIDEO AWARDS
 Best Bisexual Video: Valley of the Bi Dolls
 Best Boxcover Concept, Gay Video: Hologram
 Best Director, Bisexual Video: Josh Eliot, Valley of the Bi Dolls
 Best Director, Gay Video: Sam Abdul, Romeo & Julian
 Best Editing, Gay Video: Tab Lloyd, Total Corruption
 Best Gay Alternative Specialty Video: Male Genital Massage
 Best Gay Alternative Video Release: Chi Chi LaRue's Hardbody Video Magazine
 Best Gay Solo Video: Pumping Fever
 Best Music, Gay Video: Michael Anton, Tom Alex, Sharon Kane; Romeo & Julian
 Best Newcomer, Gay Video: Zak Spears
 Best Non-Sex Performance, Gay Video: Gino Colbert, Honorable Discharge
 Best Packaging, Gay Video: Hologram
 Best Screenplay, Gay Video: Jerry Douglas, Honorable Discharge
 Best Sex Scene, Gay Video: Johnny Rey, Grant Larson, Romeo & Julian
 Best Supporting Performer, Gay Video: Zak Spears, Total Corruption
 Best Videography, Gay Video: Todd Montgomery, Abduction 2 & 3

Honorary AVN Awards

Special Achievement Award 
 Bob Best, of Bon-Vue
 Howie Wasserman, Paul Wisner, Bruce Walker, Ron Wasserman; Gourmet Video
 Susan Colvin, Don Browning, Christian Mann; Video Team/CPLC
 Michael Warner, Ron Zdeb; Great Western Litho
 Russell Hampshire, of VCA Pictures
 Marty Feig, of Las Vegas Video
 Sidney Niekerk, Jack Gallagher; Cal Vista Video

Hall of Fame 

AVN Hall of Fame inductees for 1994 were: Buck Adams, Juliet Anderson, Bionca, Tiffany Clark, Lisa De Leeuw, Steve Drake, Harold Lime, Robert McCallum, Ed Powers, Janus Rainer, Mitchell Spinelli, Raven Touchstone

Multiple nominations and awards 

Among the movies receiving the most nominations were: Justine: Nothing to Hide 2 with 13, Whispered Lies with 12 and Haunted Nights with nine.

The following thirteen movies received multiple awards:
 8 - Justine: Nothing To Hide 2
 6 - Haunted Nights
 4 - Hidden Obsessions, Romeo & Julian
 2 - Abduction 2 & 3, Hologram, Honorable Discharge, Immortal Desire, New Wave Hookers 3, Total Corruption, Valley of the Bi Dolls, Whispered Lies, More Dirty Debutantes 22

Presenters and performers 

The following individuals, in order of appearance, presented awards or performed musical numbers. The show's trophy girls were Christina Angel and Felecia.

Presenters

Performers

Ceremony information 

Actor Randy West hosted the show for the third consecutive year. His co-host for the first half of the show was Janine Lindemulder while Summer Knight co-hosted the last half. Randy West opened the show with a song, “What Do You Call a Movie?”, the lyrics of which contained titles of about 40 movies from the past year.

Several other people were involved with the production of the ceremony. The live show was produced by Gary Miller while musical direction was undertaken by Mark J. Miller. A VHS videotape of the show was also published and sold by VCA Pictures, which was produced and directed by S. Marco Di Mercurio.

Just prior to presentation of the award for Best All-Girl Sex Scene—Video, Shane pulled out an engagement ring at the podium and proposed marriage to her co-presenter Seymore Butts. A surprised Seymore Butts then pulled an engagement ring out of his pocket and said he had also intended to propose to Shane that evening, then promptly went down on his knees to do so.

There were several new categories this year, or categories now split in two between film and video: Best Sex Scene—Film (Group), Best Sex Scene—Film (Couple), Best Sex Scene—Film (All-Girl), Best Sex Scene—Video (Group), Best Sex Scene—Video (Couple), Best Sex Scene—Video (All-Girl), Best Anal Sex Scene, Best Art Direction—Film, Best Art Direction—Video, Best Explicit Series, Best Foreign Release, Best Amateur Series, Best Pro-Am Series, Best Alternative Release—Video, Best Alternative Release—Film, Best Gay Alternative Video Release, Best Gay Alternative Specialty Video.

Hidden Obsessions was announced as the top selling movie of the year, while New Wave Hookers 3 was announced as the top renting tape of the year.

See also 

 AVN Award for Best Actress
 AVN Award for Best Supporting Actress
 AVN Award for Male Performer of the Year
 AVN Award for Male Foreign Performer of the Year
 AVN Award for Female Foreign Performer of the Year
 AVN Female Performer of the Year Award
 List of members of the AVN Hall of Fame

References

Bibliography

External links 

 
 Adult Video News Awards  at the Internet Movie Database
 
 
 

AVN Awards
1993 film awards
AVN Awards 11
1994 in Nevada